RFA Engadine (K08) was a helicopter support ship of the Royal Fleet Auxiliary. 

The need for Engadine was seen in the mid-1960s as more and more helicopters were deployed from Royal Navy aircraft carriers and surface combatants. The ship was ordered in August 1964, from Henry Robb of Leith, and commissioned in December 1967, replacing . She was the third British ship named HMS Engadine the previous two being a seaplane carrier and an aircraft transport ship. Engadine comes from the Engadin valley in south-east Switzerland, which is represented by the alphorns and edelweiss on her badge.

In 1968 she was designated as one of the PYTHON locations for the dispersal and continuity of government in the event of nuclear war.

Engadine'''s homeport throughout her career was Portland, Dorset. During the 1976 crisis in Lebanon she was deployed as part of contingency planning to evacuate British citizens.

At the Silver Jubilee fleet review in 1977 she followed the royal yacht .

In the Falklands War she was a helicopter support and refuelling ship in San Carlos Water. 

By the mid-1980s Engadine was becoming obsolescent so the container ship MV Contender Bezant was bought for conversion, becoming . Engadine'' was decommissioned in 1989 and sold to new owners in Greece.  She arrived at Piraeus on 18 February 1990 after being bought by Greek owners for a new service which never materialised and the ship was laid up, name unchanged.  She was sold for scrap and arrived at Alang for demolition on 7 May 1996 which commenced on 23 September 1996.

References

Bibliography

External links

 

1966 ships
Falklands War naval ships of the United Kingdom
Ships of the Royal Fleet Auxiliary
Ships built in Leith